Emre (Dark Matter) (or Emre [Dark Matter]) is a compilation album released on CD in a regular and limited edition version. The limited edition version was limited to a pressing of 500, in heavy card slipcase with a second booklet.

Track listing
Source Research: "Open/Threshold" - 1:35
Cyclobe: "Silent Key" - 14:36
Andrew Poppy: "Blind Fold" - 12:39
CoH: "Netmörk" - 12:02
Source Research + Leif Elggren: "Fear (The Scuffle Of Angels)" - 13:00
Coil: "Broken Aura" - 8:05
(untitled silent track) - 0:09
(untitled silent track) - 0:09
(untitled silent track) - 0:09
(untitled silent track) - 0:09
(untitled silent track) - 0:09
(untitled silent track) - 0:09
(untitled silent track) - 0:09
(untitled silent track) - 0:09
(untitled silent track) - 0:09
(untitled silent track) - 0:09
(untitled silent track) - 0:09
(untitled silent track) - 0:09
(untitled silent track) - 0:09
(untitled silent track) - 0:09
(untitled silent track) - 0:09
Ovum: "Inonia" - 10:58
Source Research: "Close/Dark Of Heartness II" - 4:11

References
discogs.com regular release
discogs.com deluxe release

2004 compilation albums
Experimental music compilation albums